Andrew Alan Bayles (born 4 October 1946) is a British rower. He competed in the men's coxed eight event at the 1968 Summer Olympics. He married fellow Olympian rower Clare Grove in 1977.

References

External links
 

1946 births
Living people
British male rowers
Olympic rowers of Great Britain
Rowers at the 1968 Summer Olympics
Sportspeople from Derby